John Fordham (died 1425) was Bishop of Durham and Bishop of Ely.
Fordham was keeper of the privy seal of Prince Richard from 1376 to 1377 and Dean of Wells before being named Lord Privy Seal in June 1377. He held that office until December 1381.

Fordham was nominated to Durham on 9 September 1381 and consecrated on 5 January 1382. He was translated to Ely on 3 April 1388.

Fordham briefly served as Lord High Treasurer in 1386.

In 1407 Fordham appointed Maurice Plank to be master of the Grammar Scholars in Wisbech. The bishops of Ely were for many years the official Visitors to Wisbech Grammar School which claims to date to 1379.

Fordham died on 19 November 1425. His executors, listed in 1430, were Robert Wetheryngsete, John Bernard, William Derby, Thomas Reynald and Robert Crowe.

Citations

References
 

14th-century births
1425 deaths

Deans of Wells
Bishops of Durham
14th-century English Roman Catholic bishops
Lords Privy Seal
Lord High Treasurers of England
Year of birth unknown